Trouble is a 1988 single by singer/actress Nia Peeples, taken from the album Nothin' But Trouble. The single reached #71 on the Hot Black singles chart and #35 on the Hot 100 singles chart.  The song was most successful on the dance chart reaching #1 for one week in early summer 1988.

La Toya Jackson version

La Toya Jackson originally recorded "Trouble" in the late summer of 1987, but it was not included on her subsequent album, La Toya. In December 2013, Cherry Pop Records released Jackson's version of "Trouble" on an expanded 2-CD version of the album called You're Gonna Get Rocked!.

In 2015, JRED Music and Vibe On Records released "Trouble" as a single with remixes by six different artists. The single was released to digital music retailers and on CD. A megamix was included exclusively on the CD format.

Track listing

References

1988 singles
1987 songs
La Toya Jackson songs